The Ivory Coast Ligue 2 is the second tier of Ivorian Football.

Results

External links
Fédération Ivoirienne de Football
Weltfußballarchiv.com

2
Ivo